|}

This is a list of electoral district results for the Victorian 1945 election.

Results by electoral district

Albert Park 

|- style="background-color:#E9E9E9"
! colspan="6" style="text-align:left;" |After distribution of preferences

 Preferences were not distributed to completion.

Allandale

Ballarat 

 Preferences were not distributed.

Barwon

Benalla

Benambra

Bendigo

Borung

Box Hill 

 Preferences were not distributed.

Brighton

Brunswick

Camberwell

Carlton

Caulfield

Clifton Hill 

 Preferences were not distributed.

Coburg 

 Preferences were not distributed.

Collingwood

Dandenong 

 Preferences were not distributed.

Dundas

Elsternwick

Essendon

Evelyn

Footscray

Geelong

Gippsland East

Gippsland North 

 Preferences were not distributed.

Gippsland South

Gippsland West

Glen Iris

Goulburn

Grant

Hampden

Hawthorn

Ivanhoe

Kew

Korong

Malvern

Melbourne

Mentone

Mernda

Midlands

Mildura

Moonee Ponds

Mornington

Murray Valley

Northcote

Oakleigh

Polwarth

Portland

Port Melbourne

Prahran 

 Preferences were not distributed.

Preston

Rainbow

Richmond

Ripon

Rodney

Scoresby

Shepparton

St Kilda

Sunshine

Swan Hill

Toorak

Warrnambool

Williamstown 

 Preferences were not distributed.

Wonthaggi

See also 

 1945 Victorian state election
 Members of the Victorian Legislative Assembly, 1945–1947

References 

Results of Victorian state elections
1940s in Victoria (Australia)